Erwin Vollmer (October 19, 1884 in Berlin – June 27, 1973 in Rehlingen) was a German painter and sculptor, specialising in landscape paintings and nude and animal sculptures in terracotta and bronze. He was the brother of art historian Hans Vollmer. His works are now a part of the collections of the Altonaer Museum and the Pomeranian State Museum, among others.

References 

1884 births
1973 deaths
German painters
German sculptors